Average life may refer to:
 Average life span, statistical life expectancy for a certain population
 Exponential decay#Mean lifetime, average survival time in an exponentially decreasing set
 Weighted-average life, loan repayment timing